Kuusk is a common surname in Estonia (meaning spruce), and may refer to:
Ivo Kuusk (born 1937). Estonian opera singer 
Kaimo Kuusk (born 1975), Estonian diplomat and foreign intelligence officer
Kristina Kuusk (born 1985), Estonian fencer
Märten Kuusk (born 1996), Estonian footballer 
 (born 1938), Estonian music theorist
Priit Kuusk (born 1973), Estonian journalist :et

See also
Kuusik

Estonian-language surnames